East Timor is divided into:
 Municipalities of East Timor (14)
 Administrative posts of East Timor (65)
 Sucos of East Timor (452)
 Aldeias of East Timor (2,233)

References